Meredith Badger is a children's book author. Her books include the Fairy School Dropout series, the Tweenie Genie series, and two books in the Go Girl! series. She has also written a young adult novel, Shift, under the pseudonym Em Bailey.

Badger was born in Australia and lives with her daughter and husband.

Bibliography

Fairy School Dropout Series
Fairy School Dropout, Feiwel & Friends, 2010
Fairy School Dropout Undercover, Feiwel & Friends, 2010
Fairy School Dropout: Over the Rainbow, Feiwel & Friends, 2011

Tweenie Genie Series
Tweenie Genie: Genie in Training, Feiwel & Friends, 2011
Tweenie Genie: Genie High School
Tweenie Genie: Genie In Charge

Go Girl! Series
 Go Girl! #11: Camp Chaos, Feiwel & Friends, 2008
 Go Girl #12: Back to School, Feiwel & Friends, 2008

References

Living people
Year of birth missing (living people)
Australian children's writers
Australian expatriates in Germany
Australian women children's writers
21st-century Australian women writers
21st-century Australian writers